Evergreen Laurel Hotel Keelung (Chinese：長榮桂冠酒店（基隆）) is a  tall five star hotel located on Zhongzheng Road, Zhongzheng District, Keelung, Taiwan, which opened in 1998.

Facilities
The hotel has 140 guest rooms, and 19 floors. The hotel is operated by Evergreen International Hotels. and offers free wifi, a swimming pool as well as free parking.

Restaurants & Bars
 The Peng's Agora Garden: Chinese restaurant featuring traditional Hunan cuisine, located on the fifth floor.
 Café Laurel: Café located on the 18th and 19th floor with views of the Pacific Ocean as well as Port of Keelung.
 Gourmet Shop: Bakery offering fresh pastries, located on the first floor.

References

External links
Official website

1998 establishments in Taiwan
Hotels in Taiwan
Hotels established in 1998
Hotel buildings completed in 1998
Hotels in Keelung